Hagerstown Jr.-Sr. High School is a High School located in Hagerstown, Indiana, United States. It serves the Nettle Creek School Corporation, which also includes the towns of Economy and Greensfork, both of which had their own schools until they were merged into Hagerstown.

Athletics
The Hagerstown Tigers wear purple, gold, and white  and participate as members of the Tri-Eastern Conference along with Wayne County schools:  Centerville,  Northeastern, and  Lincoln. The Tigers are host to the Wayne County boys' and girls' varsity basketball tournaments, along with the area boys' basketball sectional for the 2A level.

Notable alumni
Ralph Teetor, inventor of cruise control
Clark Wissler, anthropologist, ethnologist, and archaeologist

See also
 List of high schools in Indiana

References

External links
 Official website
 District website
 IHSAA
 Review
 Athletics information

Public high schools in Indiana
Schools in Wayne County, Indiana